La miel se fue de la luna ("The Honey Went from the Moon") is a 1952 Mexican film.

Cast
 Abel Salazar
 Alma Rosa Aguirre
 Sara García
 Julio Villarreal
 Antonio Monsell

External links
 

1952 films
1950s Spanish-language films
Mexican black-and-white films
Mexican romantic comedy films
1952 romantic comedy films
1950s Mexican films